First Graders (Avvalihā...) is a 1984 Iranian documentary feature film directed by Abbas Kiarostami, in which a hidden camera follows a group of first graders during a day at school.

See also
List of Iranian films

References

1984 films
1980s Persian-language films
Iranian documentary films
Films directed by Abbas Kiarostami
1984 documentary films
Documentary films about education
Documentary films about children